Q Link Wireless is an American telecommunications company based in Dania, Florida that provides free wireless services to Lifeline eligible consumers. The company also offers prepaid mobile phone services including wireless voice, messaging, and data services under the Hello Mobile brand.

Q Link Wireless is one of multiple companies owned and operated under Quadrant Holdings, and was founded in 2011 by its CEO, Issa Asad. Asad has been the company’s only CEO since its founding.

Provided service

Lifeline service 
Q Link Wireless provides service for low-income-eligible individuals who do not already have a Lifeline account. The Lifeline service is funded through the Universal Service Fund. The Lifeline program is available to eligible low-income consumers in every state, territory, commonwealth, and on Tribal land. Applications for service can be made through the Q Link Wireless homepage or by mailing or faxing the application form. Q Link Wireless is contracted with T-Mobile as a Mobile Virtual Network Operator.

Customers may purchase more minutes once their free monthly benefit is exhausted.

Lifeline phone plans 
Q Link Wireless offers a general Lifeline phone plan called “Always On Plan”.

Eligibility requirements 

Q Link Wireless offers free or discounted service to eligible Americans who are currently enrolled in a government benefit program or meet certain low-income requirements for their state. Government benefit programs that meet qualifications are standard and set by FCC, but commonly include Food Stamps (Supplemental Nutrition Assistance Program), Medicaid, and Supplemental Security Income.

Legal issues 

In July 2014, CEO Issa Asad was arrested for fatally running over a groundskeeper following a dispute over $65. Asad pled no contest and was sentenced to one year of probation. Asad had previously pled guilty in 1995 to aggravated battery of a police officer and was sentenced to three months probation.

On June 9, 2021, the company's Florida headquarters was raided by the United States Postal Inspection Service for an investigation that has been ongoing since 2019, the reason for the investigation was not disclosed.

References 

Mobile virtual network operators